Sandra Khopon (born January 9, 1994 in Los Angeles) is a Thai-American former competitive figure skater. She qualified to the free skate at the 2012 Four Continents Championships and went on to finish 15th overall.

Programs

Competitive highlights

References

External links 
 

Sandra Khopon
American female single skaters
1994 births
Living people
Figure skaters from Los Angeles
Figure skaters at the 2011 Asian Winter Games
American sportspeople of Thai descent